The Fiji Sevens, also known as the Suva Sevens is an international rugby union sevens tournament held at the National Stadium in Suva, Fiji. It was a part of the Sevens World Series in 2000, but in the wake of the Fijian coup d'état later that year, the tournament was dropped from the World circuit for the following season.

Results

Key:Blue border on the left indicates tournaments included in the World Rugby Sevens Series.

See also

 Aftermath of the 2000 Fijian coup d'état

References

External links

 
Former World Rugby Sevens Series tournaments
International rugby union competitions hosted by Fiji
Rugby sevens competitions in Oceania
Rugby union competitions in Oceania for national teams
Recurring sporting events established in 1993
Recurring sporting events disestablished in 2000
1993 establishments in Fiji